Perhaps Love may refer to:

Film and television
 Perhaps Love (1987 film), an Australian film directed by Lex Marinos
 Perhaps Love (2005 film), a Chinese film directed by Peter Chan
 Perhaps Love (2021 film), a South Korean film
 Perhaps Love (TV series), a Chinese reality show

Music
 Perhaps Love (album), an album by Plácido Domingo with collaboration from John Denver 
 "Perhaps Love" (song), a song by John Denver and title song from the album Perhaps Love. 

 "Perhaps Love", theme song by Jacky Cheung from the Chinese film Perhaps Love 
 "Perhaps Love", a Korean song by Jang Na-ra from her album Sweet Dream
 "Perhaps Love (사랑인가요 [Sarang In Ga Yo])", ending theme song of Princess hours